The Wind Gods: 33rd America’s Cup is a 2011 documentary sailing yacht racing sports film about the 2010 America's Cup (the 33rd Cup) revised in 2013. The film is narrated by Jeremy Irons, directed by Fritz Mitchell, and produced by Skydance Productions. The soundtrack composed by Pinar Toprak won the 2011 IFMCA Best Documentary Score award. The film aired nationally on PBS (the U.S. Public Broadcasting Service) in 2013.

Film
The film The Wind Gods: 33rd America's Cup was produced by David Ellison, son of Larry Ellison, and his production company, Skydance Productions. Larry Ellison is the syndicate CEO of Oracle Team USA, the winning team in the 33rd America's Cup (AC33), and chairman and founder of Oracle Corporation, the title sponsor of the winning syndicate. David Ellison collaborated with Julian Guthrie on the film. Guthrie wrote the nonfiction book The Billionaire and the Mechanic about the history of Oracle Team USA. The DVD and advertising campaign were produced by Bean Labs, in conjunction with Mt. Philo Films.

Synopsis
The film profiles Larry Ellison, Russell Coutts, and Ernesto Bertarelli. Coutts is the skipper for Oracle Team USA who was hired away from Bertarelli's Switzerland's Team Alinghi. Bertarelli is the head of the defending champion, the Swiss syndicate Team Alinghi, running the yacht Alinghi 5, while Oracle runs the yacht USA-17. The film proceeds to cover the proceedings of the America's Cup regatta, a championship composed of multiple rounds of racing.

Soundtrack

A soundtrack album was released, The Wind Gods: Original Motion Picture Soundtrack, composed by Pinar Toprak, released by Caldera Records, ID# C6012, containing 19 tracks, 18 music and one commentary. The film score received the International Film Music Critics Association Award for Best Documentary Score in 2011.

Track listing

Workography
 DVD: ; ; ;
 CD: ; ; ;

Awards and honors
 Winner — 2011 International Film Music Critics Association (IFMCA) Award for Best Documentary Score

References

External links
 Official trailer: PBS Chicago WTTW, The Wind Gods, WTTW Promos and Previews (05/02/13)
 Official film website: 
 Official album webpage: Caldera Records, The Wind Gods (CD movie score)

See also
 The Billionaire and the Mechanic (2013 book), by Julian Guthrie, documenting the rise of Larry Ellison's challenge for the America's Cup
 Wind (film), fictionalized account of Dennis Conner's loss and then win of the America's Cup

2010 America's Cup
2011 films
2010s sports films
2011 documentary films
Competitive sailing films
American sports documentary films
American television films
Films scored by Pinar Toprak
Films set in 2010
2011 soundtrack albums
Documentary film soundtracks
Film scores
America's Cup
Sports film soundtracks
2010s English-language films
Larry Ellison
2010s American films